Blue Miasma is the fifth studio album by black metal band Krieg. Krieg split up after the release of this album. Darkland Records released a vinyl version limited to 888 copies; the first 300 copies were blue.

Track listing

Personnel
Imperial
Marcus Kolar
Azentrius (Session)
Satanic Tyrant Werewolf (Vocals)

2006 albums
Krieg (band) albums